Eliza Jane Schneider is an American actress, voice actress, singer, playwright, dialect coach and dialectologist. She has appeared on television and as a voice over actress on video games and animations. She also performs various musical and stage shows.

Early life and television work
Schneider spent her formative years on a Chippewa reservation in Bemidji, Minnesota with her two older brothers in a mostly Jewish family. Her father was a math and drama teacher at the School of Arts High School in Rochester, New York, where she graduated as salutatorian. Her mother was an attorney for the reservation. She started playing violin, learning the Suzuki method, after seeing El Shenkar. When she was sixteen, she was in her first musical group, IT'S MY PARTY! From ages 7–20, she went to Jewish summer camp, becoming a counselor, and started performing on stage. By the time she was in the fourth grade she began writing and performing her own plays, because the teacher told her that she would only be allowed to stage a play if she "wrote, produced, directed." Four years later she was chosen for a part in Annie; Schneider's parents would not let her tour with the troupe after being cast. She participated in a theater program at Northwestern University's National High School Institute and graduated from UCLA as a world arts and cultures major.

While in college she continued going to auditions and got the role of Sheila Brentwood in the television series The Amazing Live Sea Monkeys. For the show she was allowed to cast the actors who played her parents. After the show got canceled, she replaced Alanna Ubach for the second and third seasons of Beakman's World.

Dialect research and stage shows
For her college senior thesis, Schneider made a cross-country road tour in a former ambulance studying regional dialects. During her research into accents, she "visited all the English-speaking countries in the world, conducting more than 7,000 interviews over all." From the interviews she created a one-woman show called Freedom of Speech in which she tells the stories of 34 people in their voices. The various quotes are combined into a story. When interviewed about the shows by Western Washington University newspaper The Western Front, she explained that "People in America today are scared to speak up and tell their perspective on what our nation is or where it is going... I wanted to repeat the peoples' words verbatim so the audience could develop their own perspective." Using a semi-autobiographical approach, Schneider links the quotes and stories together, saying "it’s really a love story about a petulant girl who starts out hating America for perpetuating hate. She begins collecting sounds and winds up falling in love with her country." The show won the 2003 New York International Fringe Festival award for "Best Solo Show".

Her ensuing solo show, Words of the Prophets, is composed partially of quotes from "homeless people all over the world."

In 2008, Schneider wrote a play called "Sounds of Silence: A Documentary Puppet Musical Farce" about the 2004 United States election voting controversies in Ohio.

Music and voiceover work
When explaining about her dialect and musical interest she said; "You know how they talk about a photographic memory? That’s not actually how my mind works. It’s aural. I remember what I hear...when I try to do a piece onstage, I hear the next words [they actually said]. I hear the rest of the monologue. It takes every bit of strength and intellect that I have to control that." In a 2013 interview she explained that "to me, music, voice, voices of the people, play writing, dialect, language, violin – it all springs from the same well of fascination with sound."

After Mary Kay Bergman, the voice of many South Park characters, died, a friend of Schneider's asked her to contact her agent to arrange an audition. Schneider and Mona Marshall were hired as the lead female voice actors. This was a position she held until 2003, when she left over the show's producers' refusal to extend her a union contract. She was replaced by April Stewart. During this time Schneider was part of Honey Pig, an all-female country and western trio.

Accident and family life
In 2006, Schneider was involved in a car accident, resulting in a head injury and a broken hand.

Schneider and her partner, Roger Ray, have a son named Raiden Daniel. Schneider is working as a violin instructor for her son and other children.

In 2012, she joined the cast of Spider Baby the Musical for a San Diego performance, playing the role of Emily Howe.

Video game voiceover projects
 Kingdom Hearts II (2006) – Elizabeth Swann, additional voices
 Pirates of the Caribbean: The Legend of Jack Sparrow (video game) (2006) –  Elizabeth Swann, Nassau Villager Female #3
 Finding Nemo (2003) – additional voices
 Shadow Complex (2009) – Clair
 Assassin's Creed II (2009) – Rebecca Crane
 Ratchet & Clank Future: A Crack in Time (2009) – Valkyrie No. 2
 Alice in Wonderland (2010 video game) – The White Queen
  Blade Kitten (2010) – Justice Kreel, Terra-Gin, additional voices
 Assassin's Creed: Brotherhood (2010) – Rebecca Crane
 Assassin's Creed: Revelations (2011) – Rebecca Crane
 Assassin's Creed III (2012) – Rebecca Crane
 Lego The Lord of the Rings (2012) – Additional voices
 Sly Cooper: Thieves in Time (2013) – Ms. Decibel
 Assassin's Creed IV: Black Flag (2013) – Rebecca Crane
 The Lego Movie Videogame (2014)
 Skylanders: Trap Team (2014) – Mags, Bat Spin
 Final Fantasy Type-0 HD (2015) – Arecia Al-Rashia
 Skylanders: SuperChargers (2015) – Mags, Bat Spin
 Lego Dimensions (2015) – Additional voices
 Assassin's Creed Syndicate (2015) – Rebecca Crane
 Lego Marvel's Avengers (2016) – Pepper Potts
 Prey (2017) – Mikhaila Ilyushin
 Agent of Mayhem (2017) – Agent Rama
 Kingdom Hearts III (2019) – Elizabeth Swann
 Assassin's Creed Valhalla (2020) – Rebecca Crane

Television
 The Amazing Live Sea Monkeys (1992) (as Sheila Brentwood)
 Black Tie Affair (1993)
 Beakman's World (1993–1995) (as Liza)
 South Park (1999–2003)
 Spy TV
 Episode 1.2. (2001) (as various characters)
 Girlfriends (Season 2)
 Episode: "Sister, Sista" (2002) (as Lynn Searcy's sister, Tanya)
 Invader Zim (2003) (episode The Girl Who Cried Gnome as Moofy)
 Squirrel Boy (2006–2007) (Martha)
 Popzilla (2009) MTV
 Batman: The Brave and the Bold (2011) (episode The Scorn of the Star Sapphire! as Baroness Paula von Gunther and Georgette Taylor)
 Rise of the Teenage Mutant Ninja Turtles (2018) (Mrs. Cuddles)

Character voices
This a partial list of Schneider's regular voiceover characters.
 South Park
 Wendy Testaburger
 Sharon Marsh
 Liane Cartman
 Shelley Marsh
 Mayor McDaniels
 Principal Victoria
 Mrs. Crabtree
 Carol McCormick
 Estella
 Popzilla
 Gisele Bündchen
 Tori Spelling
 Michelle Obama
 Britney Spears
 Beyoncé
 Ugandan Adoption Agent
 Heidi Klum

Video games
 Alice in Wonderland – The Talking Flowers
 Assassin's Creed series – Rebecca Crane
 Blade Kitten – Justice Kreel, Terra-Gin, Squamatan Female 1
 Call of Duty: Black Ops III – Additional Voices
 Call of Juarez: The Cartel – Additional Voices
 Captain America: Super Soldier – HYDRA
 Diablo III – Additional Voices
 Diablo III: Reaper of Souls – Female Necromancer
 Dragon Age: Origins – Iona, Lady Dace, Mardy, Nutella, Lothering Sister, Lothering Refugee, Surface Dwarf, Tapster's Patron, Howe Estate Cook, Alienage Elf Woman, Awestruck Villager, Circle Tower Apprentice Mage, Royal Palace Servant
 Epic Mickey – Additional Voices
 EverQuest II – Generic Female Barbarian Merchant, Generic Female Dark Elf Merchant, Generic Female Dwarf Merchant
 Fallout: New Vegas – Stella, Female Sorrows 
 Final Fantasy Type-0 HD – Arecia
 Final Fantasy XIII-2 – Additional Voices
 Final Fantasy XV – Additional voices
 Grand Theft Auto V – The Local Population
 Infinity Blade III – Additional Voices
 Kingdom Hearts III – Elizabeth Swann
 Kingdoms of Amalur: Reckoning – Maid of Windemere, Additional Voices
 LawBreakers – Bomchelle
 Lego Dimensions – Nya
 Lego Marvel's Avengers – Pepper Potts/Rescue
 Middle-earth: Shadow of War – Nemesis Orcs
 Neverwinter Nights 2: Mask of the Betrayer – NPC Female Teen, NPC Female Gnome, Lienna
 Prey – Mikhaila Ilyushin
 Ratchet & Clank Future: A Crack in Time – Valkyrie No. 2
 Saints Row – Stilwater's Resident
 Saints Row: The Third – Pedestrian and Character Voices
 Saints Row IV – The Voices of Virtual Steelport
 Shadow Complex – Claire Duncan
 Skylanders: SuperChargers – Mags, Bat Spin
 Skylanders: Trap Team – Mags, Bat Spin
 Sly Cooper: Thieves in Time – Miss Decibel
 The Bard's Tale – Additional voices
 The Last of Us – Additional Voices
 The LEGO Movie Videogame – Additional Voices
 The Lord of the Rings: Aragorn's Quest – Eowyn
 Yogi Bear: The Video Game – Rachel Johnson

References

External links
 
 
 Salon.com's article on Blue Girl

Living people
20th-century American actresses
21st-century American actresses
Place of birth missing (living people)
American child actresses
American film actresses
American video game actresses
American voice actresses
Dialectologists
Actresses from Rochester, New York
Voice coaches
21st-century American singers
21st-century American women singers
Year of birth missing (living people)